August Alle ( in Viljandi – 8 July 1952 in Tallinn) was an Estonian writer.

Early life
August Alle was the son of a stonemason. He attended the parish school in Viljandi, then the evening school in Narva. In 1915, he enrolled as an external student in Oryol and began studying pharmacy, but he soon abandoned those studies. From 1915 to 1918 he studied medicine at the University of Saratov. From August 1922 Alle studied law at the University of Tartu. He postponed his final law exams until 1937. He subsequently practiced as a freelance lawyer.

Literary career
After studying medicine August Alle worked in Estonia as a journalist and lecturer, before he is completely devoted himself to writing. From 1919 he was one of the figures association with the Siuru movement. August Alle was also known as a columnist and literary critic. His literary breakthrough came with his 1921 poem collection Carmina Barbata.
 
His writing was deliberately outrageous, ironic, sarcastic and satirical. He was a master of the epigram and sketches. His pen was sharp and feared in Estonia. He turned particularly against the emerging middle class of the inter-war period. In his works he drew on his experiences in the revolutionary Petrograd and Tartu in Estonia after the Estonian War of Independence.

August Alle's poetry turned strongly against the fascist tendencies in Europe of that time.

Soviet collaboration
After the Soviet occupation of Estonia in 1940, Alle became an advisor to the Ministry of Education and chairman of a Soviet Commission that drew up lists of books to be banned and removed from libraries. Among the books banned were works of Sigmund Freud, Rudolf Steiner, Artur Adson, Gustav Suits and Marie Under. In all, 1552 titles were banned.

August Alle belonged to the Board of the Estonian Writers Association. In addition, he was editor at various literary journals. In 1942 he joined the Communist Party of Estonia. During the German invasion, he was director of the press department of the Communist Party.

From 1946 until his death he was chief editor of the prestigious, though after 1944 Soviet controlled, literary magazine Looming (Estonian for "creation").

Alle's best known poem is the Eesti pastoraal (Estonian pastoral).

Works
Üksinduse saartele (1918)
Carmina Barbata (1921)
Laul kleidist helesinisest ja roosast seelikust (1925)
Ummiklained (1930)
Karmid rütmid (1934)
Lilla elevant (1923)
Epigrams (1944)

References

External links
 August Alle at Estonian Writers' Online Dictionary

1890 births
1952 deaths
Estonian male poets
People from Viljandi
Burials at Metsakalmistu
20th-century Estonian poets
20th-century male writers
University of Tartu alumni
Estonian magazine editors
Looming (magazine) editors